is a Japanese manga series written and illustrated by Reiji Suzumaru.  A spinoff, titled , began in 2015.  Both series are published in English by Seven Seas Entertainment.

Characters

A normal man in his mid-twenties who finds himself in Hell after dying in a drunken accident.

A young and attractive female devil whose job is to torture Rintaro for his sins.  Rintaro's is the first soul she has dealt with.
Matsubashi
A masochist who will rent out his services and be tortured in others' stead.  He manipulates Rintaro into a number of bad situations.

The protagonist of Love in Hell: Death Life, who, like Rintaro, ends up in Hell after his untimely death.

Sousuke's devil guide.

Release
The series, written and illustrated by Reiji Suzumaru, was serialized in Futabasha's seinen magazine Web Comic High! starting in 2011.  Three collected volumes were published between 2012 and 2013.  A spinoff, originally titled , began publication on 26 March 2015.  Futabasha changed the title to Jigokuren - Death Life for the tankōbon release.

The series is licensed in North America by Seven Seas Entertainment, who published it in three single volumes followed by a collected omnibus edition.  Seven Seas also licensed the spinoff.

Volumes

Omnibus

Love in Hell: Death Life

Reception
Reviewing the first volume for The Fandom Post, Matthew Alexander called it "a welcome addition to the seinen series with American releases", describing it as "kind of like Sundome meets Genshiken meets Highschool of the Dead, only without zombies", and writing that "there is plenty of nudity, adult jokes, and gory torture to fill many fanboys desires; unless you're a mecha fanboy, then you're out of luck."  He gave the story a grade of B+ and the art a B.

References

External links

  at Seven Seas Entertainment
 

Comedy anime and manga
Demons in anime and manga
Futabasha manga
Hell in popular culture
Seven Seas Entertainment titles
Seinen manga
Supernatural anime and manga